Ilir Rexhep Meta (born 24 March 1969) is an Albanian politician. He served as President of Albania from 24 July 2017 to 24 July 2022. 

Previously Meta served as Prime Minister from 1999 to 2002 and he was Speaker of the Parliament of Albania from 2013 to 2017. He also held positions as Deputy Prime Minister, Minister for Europe and Foreign Affairs and Minister of Economy, Trade, and Energy. Prior to that, he held the Chairmanship of the Parliamentary Commission of European Integration. He founded the Socialist Movement for Integration in 2004.

On 28 April 2017, Meta was elected President of Albania, receiving 87 votes from the 140 Members of Parliament. On 9 June 2021, he was formally impeached by the Albanian parliament in a 104 to 7 vote making him the first Albanian president in history to be impeached by parliament. On 16 February 2022 the Constitutional Court of Albania overturned the impeachment and ruled that the accusations against him did not violate the constitution.

Early life and education 
Ilir Meta was born in Çepan, Skrapar. He graduated at the Faculty of Economics and Politics branch of the University of Tirana, where he also pursued his post-graduate studies.

Political career 

Meta has been engaged in politics since 1990, after the fall of communism in Albania, as an active participant in the students' movement against one-party rule, which brought political pluralism in Albania. Since 1992 he has been elected Member of Parliament in all legislatures, and has been an active member of several Parliamentary Commissions. From 1996 to 1997 he was Deputy Chairman of the Foreign Affairs Commission of Parliament. 
From October 1998 to October 1999, Meta was Deputy Prime Minister and Minister of Coordination, as well as State Secretary for European Integration in the Ministry of Foreign Affairs in March–October 1998.

In 2004, Meta left the Socialist Party of Albania (PS) and founded his own party, the Socialist Movement for Integration (LSI). From 2004 to 2006, Meta was nominated as a member of the International Commission on the Balkans, chaired by the former Prime Minister of Italy, Giuliano Amato. The Commission drafted a series of important recommendations towards the integration of the Western Balkan countries into the European Union.

1999–2002 

Meta became Prime Minister on 29 October 1999. At age 30 he was the second-youngest prime minister in Albanian history after Zog I, who was 27 at the time of his election in 1922. Following the 2001 parliamentary election, he initially remained Prime Minister. The President of Albania, Rexhep Meidani, approved the Government of Albania on 7 September 2001. Five days afterward, the government gave a vote of confidence to Meta's Cabinet. However, the formation of the new cabinet took almost three months. On 29 January 2002, Meta announced his resignation as Prime Minister due to party infighting between the Socialist Party leader Fatos Nano and himself. Pandeli Majko was elected Prime Minister on 22 February 2002.

During this period, Albania engaged in a range of important reforms, joining the Stabilisation and Association Process with the European Union.

2009–2017 

In the 2009 parliamentary election, the Socialist Movement for Integration (LSI) won four seats in the Parliament of Albania, with 4.8% of the total vote. The party along with PSV91 became the determining parties to form the government coalition. On 16 September 2009, the LSI allied with the Democratic Party of Albania (PD) to form the government coalition.

With the formation of the new government led by Democratic Party chairman Sali Berisha, Meta became the Deputy Prime Minister and the Minister of Foreign Affairs at the same time. He was an early and vocal campaigner for the visa-free with the Schengen Area, which was accomplished in 2010. He remains one of the most vocal campaigners and advocates of regional and European integration for all countries of the Western Balkans, as a means to further strengthen stability and peace in the region.

In 2011, Meta served as the Minister of Economy, Trade, and Energy in the center-right government of Sali Berisha, whose Democratic Party of Albania the LSI joined after the 2009 parliamentary election.

In the run-up to the eighth multi-party elections held in 2013, Meta and the Socialist Movement for Integration (LSI) left the coalition with the Democratic Party (PD) established in 2009, to transfer over to the Socialist Party (PS). The result of the elections was a victory for the Alliance for a European Albania containing with LSI led by the PS and its leader, Edi Rama. On 10 September 2013, Parliament elected Meta as Chairman of Parliament by a vote of 91 to 45.

Presidency 

On 28 April 2017, Meta was elected President of the Republic of Albania at the fourth ballot with 87 votes out of 140. He took office on 24 July 2017. In the ceremony, he was accompanied solely by his children, as his wife Monika Kryemadhi refused the title of First Lady because of her political engagement as leader of the party her husband founded, with their daughter, Era Meta, serving as the de facto First Lady.

On 26 November 2019, an earthquake struck the Durrës region of Albania, killing 51 people, injuring 3,000 others, and damaging 11,000 buildings. In January 2020, Meta met with Israel Defense Forces soldiers in Israel, and thanked them for their assistance in earthquake relief efforts, awarding the Albanian Golden Medal of the Eagle to the soldiers' unit.

As was the case with his predecessor, during his term of office his main focus has been the European integration process of Albania and global challenges affecting Albania. Meta has underscored the willingness of Albanians to strengthen its bilateral strategic partnerships with all partner countries in the areas of security and NATO.

Impeachment

On 9 June 2021, Meta was impeached by the Albanian parliament with 104 MP's voting for his impeachment, which was put forward by the ruling Socialist Party of Albania. Meta had previously refused to appear before the committee investigating whether he should be impeached saying he would be "ignoring any request coming from an anti-constitutional and illegal institution". On 16 February 2022 the Constitutional Court of Albania overturned the impeachment and ruled that the accusations against him did not violate the constitution. As such, Meta would continue as President until the expiration of his term on 24 July 2022.

Controversies

Videotaped bribe scandal 
On 11 January 2011, the TV programme Fiks Fare on Top Channel broadcast a videotape recorded by hidden camera in the Ministry of Economy containing conversations between the Economy Minister at the time Dritan Prifti and then Deputy Prime Minister Ilir Meta. The videotape starts with Meta asking Prifti to intervene in a concession tender for the hydropower plant Egnatia-Shushicë in exchange for €700,000 and 7% of the shares. It then shows Meta requesting Prifti to award the auction for the sale of crude oil to Halilaj Holding Group in exchange for €1 million.
Meta then continues by asking Prifti to hire activists from their party, the Socialist Movement for Integration (LSI) at the time now renamed Freedom Party (PL). The party was the junior government partner in the government of then Prime Minister Sali Berisha, and controlled the ministries of Economy, Foreign Affairs and Health.
Meta is overheard bragging that because he is on good terms with Chief Justice Shpresa Becaj, after having hired her daughter as a diplomat at an embassy he can influence the decision of the court. He then asks Prifti to keep the affair quiet because he is afraid the prosecutor’s office might open an investigation if it learns about it.

This forced him to resign as deputy Prime Minister of Albania, even though he claimed innocence.

Sigurimi's Informer 
On 27 July 2022, the Albanian Authority for Information on Former State Security Documents (AIDSSH) forwarded to Parliament the identity of the high profile political figure referred to as “I.M.” in the initial report.

 

Two former commissions were established to run background checks on politicians and their ties to the communist regime awarded Meta a “purity certificate”. 

Meta also denied the claims and slammed the Authority for Information on Former State Security Documents, calling it the “Manipulations Authority”.

Lobbying 
Kronen Zeitung published an article in which Meta is accused of lobbying via a shell company, the article claims Meta paid $700,000 through a Cypriot shell company to gain access to the Inauguration of Donald Trump. On January 20, 2017, Meta shared a photo of himself and SMI leader Petrit Vasili at social media during the inauguration of Donald Trump in Capitol, Washington, D.C.

Meta claims to have been invited by the Republican Party, but according to a US court documents, "$700,000 of a lawyer (who is) close to Meta went through the off shore company Dorelita Limited. Socialist Movement for Integration signed a contract with the alleged lawyer a few weeks prior the Inauguration.

Personal life
Meta is a Bektashi, and adherent to traditional Bektashian values. He is fluent in Albanian, English and Italian. He is an ardent supporter of Celtic FC, often showing his passion for the club on social media. In July 2020, he founded the first Celtic Supporters Club in Albania. 

Meta has been married to Monika Kryemadhi since October 1998. They have two daughters and a son.

Honours and awards

Foreign honours
:
 Grand Cross of the Grand Order of King Tomislav (29 October 2019)
:
 Grand Cross of the Order of Saint-Charles (16 October 2019)

Awards
In March 2012, Meta received "Most Positive Personality for 2010 in Foreign Policy" award by International Institute "IFIMES" in Ljubljana, Slovenia. The award was presented to Meta by former President of Croatia, Stjepan Mesić, who was at the same time the Honorary President of "IFIMES".

Meta has also been honored by several cities and regions of Albania with the title “Honorary Citizen".

References

External links 
Official Website of the LSI Party 

|-

|-

|-

|-

 

1969 births
21st-century Albanian politicians
Albanian diplomats
Foreign ministers of Albania
Living people
Albanian Muslims
Bektashi Order
Albanian Sufis
People from Skrapar
University of Tirana alumni
Presidents of Albania
Government ministers of Albania
Prime Ministers of Albania
Deputy Prime Ministers of Albania
Socialist Movement for Integration politicians
Socialist Party of Albania politicians
Political party leaders of Albania
Speakers of the Parliament of Albania
Members of the Parliament of Albania